Chinook High School may refer to one of the following:

Chinook High School (Alberta)
Chinook High School (Montana)